Shkolnaya Street (Shkolnaya ulitsa) in Tagansky District of Moscow, Russia connects Dobrovolcheskaya Street in the west 
with Rogozhskaya Zastava Square in the east. The street, a protected heritage area lined with two-storey 19th century buildings, is closed to through traffic and is a de facto pedestrian zone and a weekend market place. 
Historically it was known as First Rogozhskaya street, the main trading street of the former Rogozhskaya Yam sloboda, and acquired its current name, one of the most common in Soviet 
toponymy, in 1923.

History

Coachmen's sloboda

Rogozhskaya sloboda of yam coachmen serving the mail route to 
Vladimir and Ryazan was established as an eastern suburb of Moscow in the end of the 16th century. 
The name of the sloboda and its streets goes back to Rogozhi (now Noginsk), 
the first overnight station on the Vladimirka road. 
In the second half of the 18th century the area experienced an influx of Old Believers, 
a persecuted religious minority that was allowed to practice their faith in an out-of-town Rogozhskoye Cemetery; 
the entrepreneurial and secretive dissidents formed a unique business community west of the coachmen's sloboda and contributed to industrialization of Eastern Moscow in the 19th century.

By 1848 First Rogozhskaya Street, one block south from the main Vladimirka road, was firmly established as the principal trading street of the sloboda (this is evidenced by black facade lines on contemporary maps indicating a continuous brick store front within a largely wooden neighborhood). Most of these building also housed inns and pubs for the coachmen; wooden coaches and flammable goods stored inside their spacious back yards contributed to accidental fires that regularly swept the sloboda.

Advent of railroads

The 1861 opening of a railroad terminal connecting Moscow to Nizhny Novgorod spelled the end of the coachmen's business but boosted the Old Believers' community. Railroad owners placed the terminal east of Rogozhsky Val Street (then the eastern city limit of Moscow), right across the sloboda, to save on cost of land. 
In 1896 passenger terminal was relocated downtown to present-day Kursky railway terminal; 
freight yards on the site of the old terminal operated until the 1950s.
According to opera tenor Pavel Bogatyryov, a native of Rogozhskaya Sloboda whose father owned a slaughterhouse and an inn with an underground blood sport pit, 
the coachmen and associated innkeeping business agonized until a disastrous three-day fire in 1886. The sloboda was rebuilt by different owners.

In 1910 the city built an electrical substation for the sprawling tramway system on the corner of First Rogozhskaya  
and Bolshaya Andronyevskaya, the building stands to date. 
Trams serving the street ran through the parallel Voronya (later Tulinskaya, now Sergia Radonezskogo) Street, the old Vladimirka; 
in 1952, when service through Tulinskaya was shut down to make way for car traffic, 
tram tracks were relocated to Shkolnaya Street. 
Service through Shkolnaya was shut down in 1980; lines on adjacent Rogozhsky Val and Bolshaya Andronyevskaya operate to date (November 2009).

First Rogozhskaya street was renamed Shkolnaya (literally School Street) in 1923; in the same year nearby Second Rogozhskaya became Bibliotechnaya (Library Street).
The 2007 Streets of Moscow reference does not cite any particular reason for the rename apart from abstract "cultural change". 
Curiously, when Moscow city limits were expanded in 1960 and the city incorporated dozens of former independent towns and villages, 
the number of Shkolnaya Streets in the city exploded from one to eighteen (not including nine Shkolny Lanes); 
in the following two decades the number shrank back to one as the former villages were razed for new highrise housing.

Reconstruction

In the 1970s and 1980s most of Rogozhskaya Sloboda itself was demolished and replaced with concrete highrise. The westernmost blocks of Shkolnaya Street, too, 
disappeared to make way for a regional Sberbank office. 
The rest of Shkolnaya Street, however, was earmarked to become a refurbished pedestrian "historical zone", not unlike Arbat Street on a smaller scale. 
Reconstruction began in 1985 and continued until 1989. Two-storey buildings on both sides of the street received a facelift, 
with groundfloor windows and gates imitating 19th century shopping outlets; 
a look at the back of these houses reveals facadist rebuilding in concrete and modern masonry.

The street, however, did not become a shopping attraction; the plan to open an ethnographic museum failed; the buildings on Shkolnaya are used for offices and on weekdays the "pedestrian" street is taken over by parked cars (transit traffic through Shkolnaya is physically blocked by concrete barriers but the street is accessible through side alleys).
On weekends the eastern half of Shkolnaya Street becomes a marketplace. 
In 2007 the city issued a permit for Moscow’s first legitimate downtown flea market to be held there.

References

Sources

 
 

Streets in Moscow
Odonyms referring to a building